Dada is a 1979 Hindi Bollywood film directed and produced by Jugal Kishore, starring Vinod Mehra, Bindiya Goswami, Amjad Khan, Jeevan in pivotal roles.

Cast 

 Vinod Mehra as Moti / Jeetu 
 Bindiya Goswami as Kamini
 Amjad Khan as Fazlu
 Jeevan as Bihari
 Raza Murad as Raghu / Jaggu (Double Role)
 Jagdeep as Jagdeep / Fake Moti
 Shashi Puri as Basheer
 Madhu Malini as Bobby 
 Ramesh Deo as Pyarelal 
 Indrani Mukherjee as Mrs. Pyarelal
 Satyendra Kapoor as Dharamdas
 Seema Deo as Tara 
 Pallavi Joshi as Munni
 Rajendranath as Alibhai Motorwala
 Mohan Sherry as Lawyer / Public Prosecutor

Soundtrack 
Music composed by Usha Khanna.

Trivia 
The film was titled "Dadaon Ka Dada"

Awards and nominations 
 Filmfare Award for Best Supporting Actor - Amjad Khan as Fazlu
 Filmfare Award for Best Male Playback Singer - K. J. Yesudas for the song "Dil Ke Tukde Tukde Karke"

References 

1979 films
1970s Hindi-language films
Films scored by Usha Khanna